Moses Kwasi Agyeman was a Ghanaian diplomat. He served as Ghana's Ambassador to the United States of America from 15 January 1978 to 24 February 1978. Prior to his appointment, he was Minister Counsellor of the Embassy of Ghana in Washington, D.C. He also served as Counsellor of the High Commission of Ghana in Pakistan, Counsellor and head of chancery of the Ghana High Commission to Kenya, and  First Secretary of the Ghana High Commission in London.

Personal life 
He was married to the late Roberta Akwele Agyeman (née Davies). Children: Theresa, Kwame, Effie, Kwabena "KB" Boakye

See also 

 Embassy of Ghana in Washington, D.C.

References 

Ambassadors of Ghana to the United States
Ghanaian diplomats
Living people
Year of birth missing (living people)